Sultana Suruzhon (Sultana Souroujon, 1900, Novi Pazar - 1962, Bat Yam) was a Bulgarian modernist painter, notable for her portraits.

Suruzhon was born on 12 May 1900 in Novi Pazar in a Jewish family. Her brother, Leon Souroujon, 13 years her younger, became a notable violinist.

Suruzhon studied at the National Academy of Arts in Sofia between 1921 and 1927 under Tseno Todorov (painting) and Kharalampi Tachev (design). After graduation, she was active in feminist movements. In 1938, Suruzhon travelled for a year to Paris. She immersed there in the local art scene and participated in an exhibition in the Grand Palais with three paintings of nudes. Subsequently, she returned to Bulgaria.

In 1953 Suruzhon immigrated from Bulgaria to Israel, where in 1962 she was killed in a traffic accident. After 1953, she widely exhibited internationally.

Her paintings are exhibited in the leading Bulgarian art museums, including the National Art Gallery in Sofia and the Plovdiv City Art Gallery.

References

20th-century Bulgarian painters
1900 births
1961 deaths
20th-century women artists
Bulgarian feminists